Virginia elected its members in April 1821, after the term began but before the new Congress convened.

See also 
 1820 Virginia's 1st congressional district special election
 1820 Virginia's 10th congressional district special election
 1820 Virginia's 17th congressional district special election
 1820 Virginia's 20th congressional district special election
 1820 and 1821 United States House of Representatives elections
 List of United States representatives from Virginia

Notes 

1821
Virginia
United States House of Representatives